The Palaung Self-Administered Zone is a self-administered zone consisting of two townships in Shan State: It was created as a separately administered unit by the 2008 Constitution. Its official name was announced by decree on 20 August 2010. The zone is to be self-administered by the Palaung people. Its capital is the town of Namhsan.

Government and politics

The Pa Laung Self-Administered Zone is administered by a Leading Body, which consists of at least ten members and includes Shan State Hluttaw (Assembly) members elected from the Zone and members nominated by the Burmese Armed Forces. The Leading Body performs both executive and legislative functions and is led by a Chairperson. The Leading Body has competence in ten areas of policy, including urban and rural development, road construction and maintenance, and public health.

Administrative divisions

The zone is divided into two townships that were previously part of Kyaukme District:

References

External links

Pa Laung Self-Administered Zone

Palaung people
Self-administered zones of Myanmar
Subdivisions of Myanmar